William Kircher (born 23 May 1958) is a New Zealand actor. William Kircher first came to prominence in New Zealand television in the police drama series Shark in the Park.

Life and career
Kircher is married to Nicole Chesterman Kircher and they have four daughters.

Kircher lied about his age when applying to Toi Whakaari, the New Zealand Drama School, so he was only 18 when he graduated two years later. He graduated with a Diploma in Acting in 1976.

In the late 1990s, Kircher shifted his focus away from acting toward production, singing, and executive management. In 2003, he went into partnership to form ScreenAdventures, a movie company. He returned to acting in 2006 in the film Out of the Blue which was based on the true story of the Aramoana massacre. Kircher appeared in the film adaptations of The Hobbit as the dwarf Bifur.

In 2018 he directed Steven Dietz's play Trust in North Hollywood with Zachary Cowan, Caroline Henry, Elizabeth Izzo, Paul McGee, Caroline Simone O’Brien and Heidi Rhodes.

Filmography

Television

Films

References

External links

1958 births
20th-century New Zealand male actors
21st-century New Zealand male actors
Living people
New Zealand male film actors
New Zealand male television actors

Toi Whakaari alumni